The Derby–Shelton Bridge is a road crossing over the Housatonic River in the U.S. state of Connecticut, connecting the cities of Derby and Shelton. It connects Route 34 in downtown Derby with Route 110 in downtown Shelton. The bridge and approaches are designated but not signed as Route 712. 
The current bridge (number 01659) was built in 1918  by the Connecticut State Highway Department to replace a former steel-arch bridge built in 1891 known as the Huntington Bridge. Prior to that, an even older wooden covered bridge (built in 1857) was at this site. The Derby–Shelton Bridge used to carry two street railway tracks until the 1930s.

Highway designation

State Road 712 (SR 712) is a state highway in Shelton, Connecticut. It connects Route 110 to Route 34 across the Housatonic River by the Derby–Shelton Bridge.

SR 712 is the primary crossing of the Housatonic River in the Naugatuck Valley and the route presently includes wide shoulders. Prior to the opening of the Commodore Hull Bridge in 1951, Route 712 was part of the former alignment of Route 8 between Shelton and Derby.

Road improvements
In 2018, the $4.3 million Connecticut state project No. 126-174 was released for public comment. The primary goal of the project is to enable improve cyclist and pedestrian access between the Derby Greenway and Shelton's Veteran's Park. This project was initiated in response to a pedestrian vs automobile accident in 2011. 

The proposed improvements include the following:
 Replace the sidewalk area on the south side of the bridge with a wider sidewalk for a pedestrian plaza and public space to include planter boxes, bi-directional cycle track, and pedestrian sidewalk.
 Replace the sidewalk on the north side of the bridge with a narrower sidewalk.
 Reconstruct the existing roadway with similar bituminous surface and concrete base.
 Reconstruct the bridge concrete parapet and pilasters to be similar to the existing historic design and finish and meet standard heights and vehicular collision criteria, along with decorative railing similar to Veteran's Park.
 Replacement of the existing "Cobra" style lighting, with decorative period light fixtures that meet dark-sky standards.
 Provide decorative accent lighting on the bridge.

References 

Buildings and structures in Derby, Connecticut
Buildings and structures in Shelton, Connecticut
Bridges completed in 1918
Bridges in Fairfield County, Connecticut
Bridges in New Haven County, Connecticut
Road bridges in Connecticut
Railroad bridges in Connecticut
Bridges over the Housatonic River
1857 establishments in Connecticut
Concrete bridges in the United States